Wedge Peak is a  mountain in the Alaska Range, in Denali National Park and Preserve. Wedge Peak lies to the northeast of Denali overlooking Brooks Glacier and Muldrow Glacier. Mount Mather (Alaska) is immediately to the east. The peak was named in 1945 by the U.S. Army Air Force cold weather test expedition.

See also
Mountain peaks of Alaska

References

Alaska Range
Mountains of Denali Borough, Alaska
Denali National Park and Preserve
Mountains of Alaska